Gabriel Enrique Kehr Sabra (aka "The Chilean Hammer") born 3 September 1996  is a Chilean athlete specialising in the hammer throw. He won the gold medal at the 2019 South American Championships with a new championships record of 75.27 metres.

His personal best in the event is 76.42 metres set in Temuco in 2019, mark he improved to 77.54 m on 29 April 2021, in the same place.

He represented Chile at the 2020 Summer Olympics.

International competitions

1No mark in the final

References

1996 births
Living people
Chilean male hammer throwers
Athletes (track and field) at the 2018 South American Games
Athletes (track and field) at the 2019 Pan American Games
Pan American Games gold medalists for Chile
Pan American Games medalists in athletics (track and field)
People from Temuco
South American Championships in Athletics winners
Pan American Games gold medalists in athletics (track and field)
Medalists at the 2019 Pan American Games
Athletes (track and field) at the 2020 Summer Olympics
Olympic athletes of Chile
21st-century Chilean people